Christopher Chizoba (born 17 June 1991) is a Nigerian professional footballer who plays as a striker.

Career
Through his career Chizoba has played at various clubs around Kolkata and once in North-East India. He started at Kalighat MS before joining Mohammedan. He then moved to Shillong Lajong of the I-League for a bit before rejoining Kalighat MS. He then ended up playing for Peerless in the Calcutta Football League.

On 4 December 2013 it was officially announced that Chizoba had signed with Mohun Bagan A.C. of the I-League.
He made his debut on 6 December 2013 against United S.C. at the Salt Lake Stadium in which he scored 2 goals in the 20th and 45+1st minutes respectively and played till 90+8th minutes before being replaced by Aiborlang Khongjee as Mohun Bagan won the match 4–0.

Chizoba announced on his Facebook page in 2019, that he had joined Welwalo Adigrat.

On 14 December 2020, Chizoba signed with Arambagh KS for the 2020–21 season in Bangladesh Football Premier League.

On 23 December 2020, Chizoba scores his 1st goal with Arambagh KS in 2020–21 Bangladesh Federation Cup.

References

1991 births
Living people
Nigerian footballers
Mohammedan SC (Kolkata) players
Shillong Lajong FC players
Mohun Bagan AC players
Ayeyawady United F.C. players
Association football forwards
I-League players
I-League 2nd Division players
Nigerian expatriate sportspeople in India
Expatriate footballers in India
Expatriate footballers in Myanmar
Calcutta Football League players
Tollygunge Agragami FC players
Nigerian expatriate sportspeople in Bangladesh
Nigerian expatriate sportspeople in Myanmar
Expatriate footballers in Ethiopia
Nigerian expatriate sportspeople in Ethiopia
Sportspeople from Lagos
Expatriate footballers in Bangladesh